Winterburn is an English surname.
Emily Winterburn, British writer, physicist and historian of science 
Florence Hull Winterburn (1858–?), American author, editor
Frederick Winterburn (1857–1926), English cricketer
Joe Winterburn, English rugby league player
Nigel Winterburn (born 1963), English footballer
Peter Winterburn (died 2019), Canadian academic
Walter of Winterburn (died 1305), English Dominican, cardinal, orator, poet, philosopher, and theologian

English-language surnames